Bella bat Jakob Perlhefter  (Isabell, Bilah, born c. 1650 in Prague, modern Czech Republic; died 1709 in Prague) was a professional Hebrew letter writer, businesswoman and instructor of music. She corresponded with her husband Behr Perlhefter and with the Christian polymath Johann Christoph Wagenseil in Hebrew. She wrote the preface of the Yiddish book “Beer Sheva” (Seven Springs).

External links
 Elisheva Carlebach: Bella Perlhefter. In: Jewish Women: A Comprehensive Historical Encyclopedia. 1 March 2009. Jewish Women's Archive.
 Rachel L Greenblatt: ´My Happiness Overturned`. Mourning, Memory and a Woman's Writing in ´Book of Seven Springs`, Lecture on the Early Modern Workshop. Volume 8: Egodocuments: Revelation of the Self in the Early Modern Period, 2011, University of Texas at Austin, August 21–23.
 Elisheva Carlebach: The Letters of Bella Perlhefter, Lecture on the Early Modern Workshop. Volume 1: Early Modern Jewries, 2004, Wesleyan University, Middletown, CT.
 Nathanael Riemer: Zwischen Tradition und Häresie. ´Beer Sheva` – eine Enzyklopädie des jüdischen Wissens der Frühen Neuzeit. Harrassowitz, Wiesbaden 2010, pp. 12–66.
 Nathanael Riemer; Sigrid Senkbeil (eds.): "´Beer Sheva` by Beer and Bella Perlhefter. An Edition of a Seventeenth Century Yiddish Encyclopedia. Wiesbaden : Harrassowitz : 2011, pp. X-XVII.

1650s births
1710 deaths